Dallas Peak is a high mountain summit in the Sneffels Range of the Rocky Mountains of North America.

Etymology 
This mountain's name was officially adopted by the U.S. Board on Geographic Names to commemorate George M. Dallas (1792–1864), American politician and diplomat who served as mayor of Philadelphia from 1828 to 1829, and as the 11th vice president of the United States from 1845 to 1849.

Climate 
According to the Köppen climate classification system, Dallas Peak is located in an alpine subarctic climate zone with long, cold, snowy winters, and cool to warm summers. Due to its altitude, it receives precipitation all year, as snow in winter, and as thunderstorms in summer, with a dry period in late spring. Precipitation runoff from the mountain drains south into the San Miguel River, and north to the Uncompahgre River via Dallas Creek.

Gallery

See also 

 List of Colorado mountain ranges
 List of Colorado mountain summits
 List of Colorado fourteeners
 List of Colorado 4000 meter prominent summits
 List of the most prominent summits of Colorado
 List of Colorado county high points

References

External links
 Weather forecast: Dallas Peak

Mountains of Colorado
Mountains of Ouray County, Colorado
Mountains of San Miguel County, Colorado
Uncompahgre National Forest
North American 4000 m summits